Lasse Pekka Männistö (born 16 March 1982) is a Finnish politician and an executive in charge of outsourcing and public relations at the Finnish private hospital corporate group Mehiläinen.

He has been criticized for violating the dignity of Parliament by filing for mid-term resignation to accept a position as Deputy Mayor.

Career 
Lasse Männistö was a Member of Parliament from 2011 to 2015 representing the National Coalition Party and elected with 4,866 votes. Additionally, he served as a member of Helsinki City Council from 2009 to 2017. In May 2015, he joined the Finnish private hospital corporate group Mehiläinen as an executive in charge of outsourcing and public relations.

Criticism 
Männistö was criticized in 2014 for violating the dignity of Parliament by filing for resignation mid-term to accept a substitute position as Deputy Mayor of Helsinki. For example, political science professor Matti Wiberg commented that "members of Parliament are not supposed to crumble the dignity of Parliament by trying to quit mid-term with meager cause". Männistö withdrew his resignation a day after and later labeled it a mistake. Finnish politician Laura Räty would have succeeded him as replacement Member of Parliament.

See also 
 Healthcare in Finland
 Politics of Finland

References

External links 
 Parliament of Finland website
 National Coalition Party website

1982 births
Living people
People from Mikkeli
National Coalition Party politicians
Members of the Parliament of Finland (2011–15)